Frédéric Blackburn (born December 21, 1972, in Chicoutimi, Quebec) is a Canadian short track speed skater who competed in the 1992 Winter Olympics and in the 1994 Winter Olympics.

In 1992 he won a silver medal in the 1000 metre short track event. He was also a member of the Canadian relay team which won the silver medal in the 5000 metre relay competition.

Two years later he finished fifth in the 500 m event and eighth in the 1000 m competition. He was also a member of the Canadian relay team which finished fourth in the 5000 metre relay contest.

References

1972 births
Living people
Canadian male short track speed skaters
Olympic short track speed skaters of Canada
Olympic silver medalists for Canada
Olympic medalists in short track speed skating
Short track speed skaters at the 1992 Winter Olympics
Short track speed skaters at the 1994 Winter Olympics
Medalists at the 1992 Winter Olympics
Sportspeople from Saguenay, Quebec
20th-century Canadian people